The Elopidae are a family of ray-finned fish containing a single living genus Elops. They are commonly known as ladyfish, skipjacks, jack-rashes, or tenpounders.

The ladyfish are a coastal-dwelling fish found throughout the tropical and subtropical regions, occasionally venturing into temperate waters. Spawning takes place at sea, and the fish larvae migrate inland entering brackish waters. Their food is smaller fish and crustaceans (shrimp). The body is fusiform (tapering spindle shape) and oval in cross-section; being slightly laterally compressed, and the eyes are large and partially covered with adipose eyelids.

Like those of eels, the larvae are leptocephalic - being highly compressed, ribbon-like, and transparent. After initial growth, they shrink and then metamorphose into the adult form.

This family is fished, but their bodies are bony, so these fish are not marketed widely for consumption. They are caught and used as bait or may be ground down for fish meal.

The name comes from the Greek ellops - a kind of serpent.

Species
The currently recognized species in this genus are:
 Elops affinis Regan, 1909 (Pacific ladyfish)
 †Elops bultyncki Nolf 2004
 Elops hawaiensis Regan, 1909 (Hawaiian ladyfish or giant herring)
 Elops lacerta Valenciennes, 1847 (West African ladyfish or Guinean ladyfish)
 Elops machnata (Forsskål, 1775) (tenpounder)
 †Elops miiformis Lin et al. 2016
 Elops saurus Linnaeus, 1766 (ladyfish)
 Elops senegalensis Regan, 1909 (Senegalese ladyfish)
 Elops smithi McBride, Rocha, Ruiz-Carus & Bowen, 2010 (malacho)

See also
 Tarpon

References

 
Pantropical fish
Fish of the Atlantic Ocean
Extant Early Cretaceous first appearances
Ray-finned fish families